Frane Ninčević (born 17 June 1999) is a Croatian tennis player.

Ninčević has a career high ATP singles ranking of 1,022 achieved on 13 September 2021. He also has a career high ATP doubles ranking of 652 achieved on 13 September 2021.

Throughout his career, Ninčević has made 2 ITF doubles finals. Winning 1 double tournament.

Ninčević made his ATP main draw debut at the 2021 Croatia Open Umag after receiving a wildcard into the doubles main draws.

World Tennis Tour and Challenger finals

Doubles: 1 (1–0)

References

External links
 
 

1999 births
Living people
Croatian male tennis players
Tennis players from Zagreb
21st-century Croatian people